Lucas Plapp (born 25 December 2000) is an Australian road and track cyclist, who currently rides for UCI WorldTeam .

Career

Junior career 
In August 2018, Plapp won the points race as well as the Madison with Blake Quick at the UCI Junior Track World Championships in Aigle, Switzerland. Plapp also placed 2nd to Remco Evenepoel in the time trial at the 2018 UCI Junior Road World Championships in Innsbruck, Austria. Plapp is part of the AusCycling High Performance Podium Academy and was selected to compete in the Team pursuit at the 2020 Summer Olympics, where they won the bronze medal.

Professional career 
Plapp rode as a stagiaire for UCI WorldTeam  in 2021 before joining them full-time in 2022. On 16 January 2022, he won the Australian National Road Race Championships after chasing down and passing James Whelan with under  left, before finishing solo. Plapp made his World tour debut in February 2022 at the UAE Tour where he rode in support of teammate Adam Yates who finished 2nd overall. Plapp himself managed his first World Tour top 5 on the 7th and final stage to Jebal Hafeet in which he finished in 5th place, 16 seconds behind winner Tadej Pogačar.

Major results 
Sources:

Road

2017
 7th Time trial, Oceania Junior Championships
2018
 1st  Time trial, Oceania Junior Championships
 1st  Time trial, National Junior Championships
 2nd  Time trial, UCI World Junior Championships
2019
 2nd Time trial, National Under-23 Championships
 5th Time trial, Oceania Under-23 Championships
2020
 1st  Time trial, National Under-23 Championships
2021
 1st  Time trial, National Championships
 2nd  Time trial, UCI World Under-23 Championships
2022
 1st  Road race, National Championships
 3rd Overall Tour of Norway
 3rd  Team relay, UCI World Championships
 Commonwealth Games
5th Time trial
6th Road race
 9th Overall Tour de Romandie
2023
 1st  Road race, National Championships
 2nd Overall UAE Tour

Grand Tour general classification results timeline

Track

2018
 UCI World Junior Championships
1st  Points
1st  Madison (with Blake Quick)
3rd  Team pursuit
 National Junior Championships
1st  Team pursuit
1st  Scratch
 3rd Team pursuit, UCI World Cup, Hong Kong
2019
 National Championships
1st  Individual pursuit
1st  Team pursuit
3rd Points
 1st Team pursuit, UCI World Cup, Brisbane
2021
 3rd  Team pursuit, Olympic Games
2022
 3rd  Team pursuit, Commonwealth Games

References

External links

2000 births
Living people
Australian male cyclists
Olympic cyclists of Australia
Cyclists at the 2020 Summer Olympics
Medalists at the 2020 Summer Olympics
Olympic bronze medalists for Australia
Olympic medalists in cycling
Cyclists from Melbourne
Cyclists at the 2022 Commonwealth Games
Commonwealth Games competitors for Australia
Commonwealth Games bronze medallists for Australia
Commonwealth Games medallists in cycling
Medallists at the 2022 Commonwealth Games